The 2018–19 CSA 3-Day Provincial Cup was a first-class cricket competition that took place in South Africa from 4 October 2018 to 14 April 2019. This was the first edition of the tournament not to be sponsored by Sunfoil, after they decided not to renew their sponsorship.

The competition was played between the thirteen South African provincial teams. In previous editions of the competition, Namibia had also competed. However, in October 2018 they withdrew from South Africa's provincial competitions, citing issues around costs and logistics.

Unlike its counterpart, the CSA Franchise 4-Day Cup, the matches were three days in length instead of four. The tournament was played in parallel with the 2018–19 CSA Provincial One-Day Challenge, a List A competition which featured the same teams. KwaZulu-Natal were the defending champions.

Eastern Province and Northerns contested the final, which finished as a draw, therefore the title was shared.

Points table

Pool A

 Team qualified for the final

Pool B

 Team qualified for the final

Fixtures

October 2018

November 2018

December 2018

January 2019

February 2019

March 2019

Final

References

External links
 Series home at ESPN Cricinfo

South African domestic cricket competitions
CSA 3-Day Provincial Cup
2018–19 South African cricket season